Florin Cârstea (born 13 September 1972) is a Romanian former footballer who played as a forward.

International career
Florin Cârstea played three games at international level for Romania, making his debut when he came as a substitute and replaced Tibor Selymes in the 84th minute of a 3–0 victory against Azerbaijan at the Euro 1996 qualifiers.

Honours
Național București
Divizia B: 1991–92
Rapid București
Cupa României: 1997–98

Notes

References

1972 births
Living people
Romanian footballers
Romania international footballers
Association football forwards
Liga I players
Liga II players
Cypriot First Division players
FC Progresul București players
FC U Craiova 1948 players
FC Rapid București players
Apollon Limassol FC players
Enosis Neon Paralimni FC players
Romanian expatriate footballers
Expatriate footballers in Cyprus
Expatriate sportspeople in Cyprus
Romanian expatriates in Cyprus
Romanian expatriate sportspeople in Cyprus
Footballers from Bucharest